Anthony James de Rothschild (born 30 January 1977) is a British businessman, philanthropist and a member of the Rothschild banking family of England.

He is the eldest son of Sir Evelyn Robert de Rothschild (1931-2022) by his second wife, American-born Victoria Lou Schott (1949- 21 January 2021), daughter of Marcia Lou Whitney and Lewis M. Schott.

He is married to Danish model and UK TV presenter Tania Strecker.

References

1977 births
Living people
English businesspeople
British racehorse owners and breeders
Anthony James de Rothschild
English people of Jewish descent